Mohit Hooda (born 19 August 1998) is an Indian cricketer. He is a Right-hand batsman and Leg-break bowler. He made his debut in first-class cricket in Ranji Trophy match on 23 November 2015 for Haryana against Rajasthan. He made his Twenty20 debut on 2 January 2016 in the 2015–16 Syed Mushtaq Ali Trophy.

References

1998 births
Living people
Indian cricketers
Haryana cricketers